= Bradycidus =

Former name for a genus of beetle

Bradycidus was formerly the name of a genus of ground beetles in the family Carabidae, with a single species, Bradycidus veneris. The current status of this genus and species is considered invalid or doubtful.
